Fascism in North America refers to political movements in the United States, Canada, Mexico, Central America and the Caribbean that are variants of fascism. Fascist movements in North America never gained power, unlike their counterparts in Europe.

Canada

In Canada, fascism was divided between two main political parties. The Winnipeg-based Canadian Union of Fascists was modelled after the British Union of Fascists and led by Chuck Crate. The Parti national social chrétien, later renamed the Canadian National Socialist Unity Party, was founded by Adrien Arcand and inspired by Nazism. The Canadian Union of Fascists in English Canada never reached the level of popularity that the Parti national social chrétien enjoyed in Quebec. The Canadian Union of Fascists focused on economic issues while the Parti national social chrétien concentrated on racist themes. The influence of the Canadian fascist movement reached its height during the Great Depression and declined from then on.

Central America

The dominance of right-wing politics in Central America by populism and the military has meant that there has been little space for the development of proper fascist movements.

As a minor movement, the Nazi Party was active among German immigrants in El Salvador, where the government cracked down on activity, and Guatemala, which outlawed the Nazi Party and the Hitler Youth in May 1939, among others. They also organised in Nicaragua although Falangism was more important, especially in the Colegio Centro América in Managua where this brand of fascism flourished in the 1930s.

Costa Rica
The existence of figures sympathetic to Nazism in high political positions has been pointed out in the administrations of León Cortés Castro and Rafael Ángel Calderón Guardia. Cortés in particular (who spent some time in Nazi Germany) was famous as sympathizer since he was a presidential candidate.

In the 1930s, a movement sympathetic to Nazism developed among the large community of German origin.  Supporters of Nazism used to meet in the German Club.

Since the declaration of war on the Third Reich by Costa Rica during Calderón Guardia's presidency, many citizens and residents of German and Italian origin were imprisoned and their properties nationalized, even though the vast majority had no links with Nazism or Fascism.  The doctrinal origins of racism and the allegations of European racial superiority in Costa Rica had previous origins, as for example among the racist writings of Costa Rican scientist Clodomiro Picado Twight.

Panama
The Central American leader who came closest to being an important domestic fascist was Arnulfo Arias of Panama who, during the 1940s, became a strong admirer of Italian fascism and advocated it following his ascension to the presidency in 1940.

Caribbean

Fascism was rare in Caribbean politics, not only for the same reasons as those in Central America but also due to the continuation of colonialism into the 1950s.  However Falangist movements have been active in Cuba, notably under Antonio Avendaño and Alfonso Serrano Vilariño from 1936 to 1940. A Cuban Nazi party was also active but this group, which attempted to change its name to the 'Fifth Column Party' was banned in 1941. As in Cuba, Falangist groups have been active in Puerto Rico, especially during World War II, when an 8000 strong branch came under FBI scrutiny.

Mexico

In 1922, the Mexican Fascist Party was founded by Gustavo Sáenz de Sicilia. The party was viewed with dismay by Italian fascists, and in 1923, the Italian ambassador stated that "This party was not anything else than a bad imitation of ours".

The National Synarchist Union was founded in 1937 by José Antonio Urquiza. The group espoused some of the aspects of the palingenetic ultranationalism which is at the core of fascism because it sought a rebirth of society away from the anarchism, communism, socialism, liberalism, Freemasonry, secularism and Americanism which it believed were dominating Mexico. However, it differed from European fascism because it was very Roman Catholic in nature. Although supportive of corporatism the National Synarchist Union was arguably too counterrevolutionary to be considered truly fascist.

A similar group, the Gold Shirts, founded in 1933 by Nicolás Rodríguez Carrasco, also bore some of the hallmarks of fascism.

A Falange Española Tradicionalista was also formed in Mexico by Spanish merchants who were based there and opposed the consistent level of support which was given to the Republican side during the Spanish Civil War by Lázaro Cárdenas. However, the group was peripheral because it did not seek to acquire any amount of influence outside this immigrant population. A Partido Nacional Socialista Mexicano was also active, with most of its 15,000 members being of German background.

A more modern group, the Nationalist Front of Mexico was founded in San Luis Potosí in 2006 by Juan Carlos López Lee. It has strongly promoted the Reconquista ideology.

United States

In the 1920s, American  intellectuals paid a considerable amount of attention to Mussolini's early Fascist movement in Italy, but few of them became his supporters. However, he was initially very popular in the Italian American community. During the 1930s, Virgil Effinger led the paramilitary Black Legion, a violent offshoot of the Ku Klux Klan that sought to establish fascism in the United States by launching a revolution. Although it was responsible for a number of attacks, the Black Legion was only a peripheral band of militants.

According to Chomsky the rise of fascism raised concerns during the interwar period, but it was largely viewed positively by the U.S. and British governments, the corporate community, and a significant portion of the elite. This was because the fascist interpretation of extreme nationalism allowed for significant economic influence in the West while also destroying the left and the hated labor groups. Hitler, like Saddam Hussein, enjoyed strong British and U.S. support until his direct action, which severely damaged British and U.S. interests. 	
William Philips, the American ambassador to Italy, was "greatly impressed by the efforts of Benito Mussolini to improve the conditions of the masses" and found "much evidence" In support of the fascist stance that "they represent a true democracy in as much as the welfare of the people is their principal objective." He found Mussolini's achievements "astounding [and] a source of constant amazement,"  and greatly admired his "great human qualities." United States Department of State enthusiastically agreed, praising fascism for having "brought order out of chaos, discipline out of license, and solvency out of bankruptcy" as well as Mussolini's "magnificent" achievements in Ethiopia. According to Scott Newton, by the time the war broke out in 1939, Britain was more sympathetic to Adolf Hitler for reasons centered on trade and financial relations as well as a policy of self-preservation for the British establishment in the face of growing democratic challenges.

German American Bund (1936–1940)

The German American Bund, was the most prominent and well-organized fascist organization in the United States. It was founded in 1936, following the model of Hitler's Nazi Germany. It appeared shortly after the founding of several smaller groups, including the Friends of New Germany (1933) and the Silver Legion of America, founded in 1933 by William Dudley Pelley and the Free Society of Teutonia. Membership in the German-American Bund was only open to American citizens of German descent. Its main goal was to promote a favorable view of Nazi Germany.

The Bund was very active. Its members were issued uniforms and they also attended training camps. The Bund held rallies with Nazi insignia and procedures such as the Hitler salute. Its leaders denounced the administration of President Franklin D. Roosevelt, Jewish-American groups, Communism, "Moscow-directed" trade unions and American boycotts of German goods. They claimed that George Washington was "the first Fascist" because he did not believe that democracy would work.

The high point of the Bund's activities was the rally at Madison Square Garden in New York City on February 20, 1939. Some 20,000 people attended, The anti-Semetic Speakers repeatedly referred to President Roosevelt  "Frank D. Rosenfeld", calling his New Deal the "Jew Deal", and denouncing the Bolshevik-Jewish American leadership. The rally ended with violence between protesters and Bund "storm-troopers". In 1939, America's top fascist, the leader of the Bund, Fritz Julius Kuhn, was investigated by the city of New York and found to be embezzling Bund funds for his own use. He was arrested, his citizenship was revoked, and he was deported. After the War, he was arrested and imprisoned again.

In 1940, the U.S. Army organized a draft in an attempt to bring citizens into military service. The Bund advised its members not to submit to the draft. On this basis, the Bund was outlawed by the U.S. government, and its leader fled to Mexico.

Father Charles Coughlin 
Father Charles Coughlin was a Roman Catholic priest who hosted a very popular radio program in the late 1930s, on which he often ventured into politics. In 1932 he endorsed the election of President Franklin Roosevelt, but he gradually turned against Roosevelt and became a harsh critic of him. His radio program and his newspaper, "Social Justice", denounced Roosevelt, the big banks, and the Jews. When the United States entered World War II, the U.S. government took his radio broadcasts off the air and blocked his newspaper from the mail. He abandoned politics but he continued to be a parish priest until his death in 1979.

The future American architect Philip Johnson was a correspondent in Germany for Coughlin's newspaper between 1934 and 1940, before he began his architectural career. He wrote articles which were favorable to the Nazis and critical of the Jews, and he also took part in a Nazi-sponsored press tour in which he covered the invasion of Poland in 1939. He quit the newspaper in 1940, was investigated by the FBI and was eventually cleared for army service in World War II. Years later he would refer to these activities as "the stupidest thing I ever did... [which] I never can atone for".

Ezra Pound 
The American poet Ezra Pound moved from the United States to Italy in 1924, and he became a staunch supporter of Benito Mussolini, the founder of a fascist state.  He wrote articles and made radio broadcasts which were critical of the United States, international bankers, Franklin Roosevelt, and the Jews. His propaganda was not well received in the U.S. After 1945, he was taken to the United States, where he was imprisoned for his actions on behalf of fascism. He was placed in a psychiatric hospital for twelve years, but in 1958, he was finally released after a campaign was launched on his behalf by American writers. He returned to Italy, where he died in 1972.

World War II and "The Great Sedition Trial" (1944)
During World War II, first Canada and then the United States battled the Axis powers to the death. As part of the war effort, they suppressed the fascist movements within their borders, which were already weakened by the widespread public perception that they were fifth columns. This suppression consisted of the internment of fascist leaders, the disbanding of fascist organizations, the censorship of fascist propaganda, and pervasive government propaganda against fascism.

In the US, this campaign of suppression culminated in November 1944 in "The Great Sedition Trial", in which George Sylvester Viereck, Lawrence Dennis, Elizabeth Dilling, William Dudley Pelley, Joe McWilliams, Robert Edward Edmondson, Gerald Winrod, William Griffin, and, in absentia, Ulrich Fleischhauer were all put on trial for aiding the Nazi cause, supporting fascism and isolationism.  After the death of the judge, however, a mistrial was declared and all of the charges were dropped.

Later years and the American Nazi Party  (1959–1983)
The American Nazi Party was founded in 1959 by George Lincoln Rockwell, a former U.S. Navy commander, who was dismissed from the Navy for his fascist political views. On August 25, 1967, Rockwell was shot and killed in Arlington by John Patler, a former party member who had previously been expelled by Rockwell for his alleged "Bolshevik leanings". The Party was dissolved in 1983.

Hierarchy of fascism 
In the view of philosopher Jason Stanley, white supremacy in the United States is an example of the fascist politics of hierarchy, because it "demands and implies a perpetual hierarchy" in which whites dominate and control non-whites.

Donald Trump and allegations of fascism 

A growing number of scholars have argued that the political style of Donald Trump resembles the political style of fascist leaders, beginning with the  Trump 2016 presidential campaign, continuing over the course of the Trump presidency as he appeared to court far-right extremists, including his attempts to overturn the 2020 United States presidential election after losing to Joe Biden, and culminating in the 2021 United States Capitol attack. As these events have unfolded, some commentators who had initially resisted applying the label to Trump came out in favor of it, including conservative legal scholar Steven G. Calabresi and conservative commentator Michael Gerson. After the attack on the Capitol, the historian of fascism Robert O. Paxton went so far as to state that Trump is a fascist, despite his earlier objection to using the term in this way. In "Trump and the Legacy of a Menacing Past",  Henry Giroux wrote: "The inability to learn from the past takes on a new meaning as a growing number of authoritarian regimes emerge across the globe. This essay argues that central to understanding the rise of a fascist politics in the United States is the necessity to address the power of language and the intersection of the social media and the public spectacle as central elements in the rise of a formative culture that produces the ideologies and agents necessary for an American-style fascism." Other historians of fascism such as Richard J. Evans, Roger Griffin, and Stanley Payne continue to disagree that fascism is an appropriate term to describe Trump's politics. 

In 2017, the Hamburg, Germany-based magazine Stern depicted Trump giving a Nazi salute and referred to neo-Nazis and the Ku Klux Klan. As reported by The Guardian in July 2021, the book Frankly, We Did Win This Election, authored by Michael C. Bender of The Wall Street Journal, recounts that White House Chief of Staff, John F. Kelly, was reportedly shocked by an alleged statement made by Trump that "Hitler did a lot of good things." Liz Harrington, Trump spokesperson, denied the claim, saying: "This is totally false. President Trump never said this. It is made-up fake news, probably by a general who was incompetent and was fired." Kelly further stated in his book that Trump had asked him why his generals could not be loyal like Hitler's generals. According to the Ohio Capital Journal, quoting his roommate, then-Republican candidate and senator-elect from Ohio, J. D. Vance, was said to have wondered whether Trump was "America's Hitler". Harvard University professor of government Daniel Ziblatt also drew similarities between Hitler's rise and Trump's.
 Trump has also been compared to Narendra Modi, and former aide Anthony Scaramucci also compared Trump to Benito Mussolini and Augusto Pinochet.

In a July 2021 piece for The Atlantic, former George W. Bush speechwriter David Frum wrote that "Trump's no Hitler, obviously. But they share some ways of thinking. The past never repeats itself. But it offers warnings. It's time to start using the F-word again, not to defame—but to diagnose." For The Guardian, Nicholas Cohen wrote: "If Trump looks like a fascist and acts like a fascist, then maybe he is one. The F-word is one we are rightly wary of using, but how else to describe the disgraced president?" New York Magazine asked, "Is It Finally Time to Begin Calling Trumpism Fascist?" Dana Milbank also believed the insurrection qualified as fascist, writing in The Washington Post, "To call a person who endorses violence against the duly elected government a 'Republican' is itself Orwellian. More accurate words exist for such a person. One of them is 'fascist.'" Dylan Matthews writing in Vox quoted Sheri Berman as saying, "I saw Paxton's essay and of course respect him as an eminent scholar of fascism. But I can't agree with him on the fascism label."

The Guardian further reported on Trump's "stand back and stand by" directive during the 2020 United States presidential debates to the Proud Boys and it also made a note of the fact that he had made "positive remarks about far-right and white supremacist groups." During the 2020 debate, Biden asked Trump to condemn white supremacist groups, specifically the Proud Boys. Trump's response was interpreted by some as a call to arms. The United States House Select Committee on the January 6 Attack public hearings explored the relationships which existed between the Oath Keepers, the Proud Boys, and Trump's allies, with evidence of coordination in the run-up to the capitol attack.

In August 2022, President Biden referred to the "extreme MAGA agenda" as "semi-fascism". In the Battle for the Soul of the Nation speech September 1, Biden criticized the "extremism" and "blind loyalty" of Trump supporters, calling them a threat to democracy. He added that he did not consider a majority of Republicans to be MAGA Republicans.

On the 13th of March, it was reported by journalist James Risen, that a 2021 United States Capitol Attack attendee was to discovered to have planned to kidnap jewish leaders uncluding the head of the ADL Jason Greenblatt, and philanthropist George Soros. Somehow, of all careers, this individual is understood to have been a Pentagon Analyst. Reportedly, he has praised Adolf Hitler as "one of the best people there has ever been on the earth", and that "somebody like Hitler to stand up and say we´re going to stand up and say we´re going to stand against this moral incineration" said that "Jews for some reason love gang raping people. It doesn´t matter what they are doing, they always have time to gang rape...".

Notable neo-fascist and neo-Nazi groups

United States
 American Front: an umbrella organization.
 American Nazi Party: Founded by George Lincoln Rockwell in 1959, this group was central to the foundation of the World Union of National Socialists.
 Aryan Brotherhood: a prison gang.
 Aryan Nations: a Christian Identity organization founded by Richard Girnt Butler.
 Aryan Republican Army: a Christian identity and white supremacist gang which robbed 22 banks in the Midwestern United States from 1992 to 1996
 Atomwaffen Division: a neo-Nazi  paramilitary terrorist organization which is infamous for its killing of 8 people, most notably, the murder of Blaze Bernstein.
 The Base (hate group): a neo-Nazi, white supremacist and accelerationist paramilitary hate group and training network, formed in 2018 by Rinaldo Nazzaro and active in the United States, Canada, Australia, South Africa, and Europe  
 Creativity Movement: a white separatist organization which espouses Creativity, an atheistic religion which espouses white supremacy.
 The Daily Stormer: an American far-right, neo-Nazi, white supremacist, misogynist, Islamophobic, antisemitic, and Holocaust denial commentary and message board that advocates a second genocide against Jews. Launched by Andrew Anglin on July 4, 2013, The Daily Stormer is part of the alt-right movement.
 National Alliance: founded in 1974 by William Luther Pierce, the author of The Turner Diaries.
 National Renaissance Party: of occultist James H. Madole.
 National Socialist Movement: formed in 1974.
 National Socialist Party of America: founded in 1970 by Frank Collin.
 National States' Rights Party: founded in 1958 by J. B. Stoner.
 New Order: led by Matt Koehl with the goal of developing a religion based on Nazism.
 The Order: a revolutionary group established in 1983 by Robert Jay Mathews
 Patriot Front: an alt-right American nationalist movement founded by Thomas Rousseau as an offshoot of Vanguard America.
 Proud Boys: a far-right militant group with ties to white nationalism.
 Stormfront: a white nationalist website.
 Universal Order: founded by James Mason and heavily influenced by Charles Manson.
 Vanguard America: founded by Dillion Irizarry, part of the Nationalist Front and the alt-right.
 Volksfront: a white power skinhead group led by Randall Krager.
 White Aryan Resistance: a highly racist organization led by Tom Metzger.
 White Patriot Party: originally the Carolina Knights of the Ku Klux Klan, a group founded by Frazier Glenn Miller Jr. in 1980.

Canada
Canadian Association for Free Expression, founded by Paul Fromm in 1981.
Heritage Front, founded in 1989 and disbanded in 2005.
National-Socialist Party of Canada, founded by Terry Tremaine in 2006.
Nationalist Party of Canada, founded in 1977 by Don Andrews.
Western Guard Party, an extremist offshoot of the Edmund Burke Society founded in 1967.

See also
 Fascism in Africa
 Racism in Africa
 Fascism in Asia
 Racism in Asia
 Fascism in Europe
 Antisemitism in Europe
 Racism in Europe
 Fascism in South America
 Racism in South America
 Geography of antisemitism
 Racism by country
 Racism in North America
 Radical right (Europe)
 List of Fascist movements
 List of fascist movements by country
 List of Ku Klux Klan organizations
 List of neo-Nazi organizations
 List of organizations designated by the Southern Poverty Law Center as hate groups
 List of white nationalist organizations

References

Further reading
 Betcherman, Lita-Rose. The swastika and the maple leaf: Fascist movements in Canada in the thirties (Fitzhenry & Whiteside, 1978).
 Cassels, Alan. "Fascism for export: Italy and the United States in the twenties." American Historical Review 69.3 (1964): 707–712 online.
 Horne, Gerald. The color of fascism: Lawrence Dennis, Racial passing, and the rise of right-wing extremism in the United States (NYU Press, 2009).
 Pinto, António Costa. Latin American Dictatorships in the Era of Fascism: The Corporatist Wave (Routledge, 2019).
 Santos, Theotonio Dos. "Socialism and fascism in Latin America today." Insurgent Sociologist 7.4 (1977): 15–24.

 
Political movements in North America